Guglielmo Vicario (born 7 October 1996) is an Italian professional footballer who plays as a goalkeeper for Serie A club Empoli.

Club career
Vicario made his Serie C debut for Venezia on 5 March 2017 in a game against Teramo.

Cagliari 
On 17 July 2019, he signed a five-year contract with Cagliari. On 25 July 2019, he joined Perugia on a season-long loan.

Empoli 
On 9 July 2021, he joined Empoli on loan with an option to purchase. On 18 June 2022, Empoli exercised their purchase option. On 4 February 2023, Vicario performed a  triple save in a league match against Roma which resulted in a defeat, while his consecutive saves were applauded by many spectators.

International career
On 17 September 2022, Vicario received his first Italy national football team callup, as manager Roberto Mancini named him to be part of the squad for the UEFA Nations League games against England and Hungary.

Honours
Venezia
 Serie C/Serie C1: 2016–17
 Coppa Italia Lega Pro: 2016–17

References

External links
 

Living people
1996 births
Sportspeople from Udine
Italian footballers
Footballers from Friuli Venezia Giulia
Association football goalkeepers
Serie A players
Serie B players
Serie C players
Serie D players
Udinese Calcio players
Venezia F.C. players
Cagliari Calcio players
A.C. Perugia Calcio players
Empoli F.C. players